Quiestède is a commune in the Pas-de-Calais department in the Hauts-de-France region of France.

Geography
Quiestède lies about 6 miles (9 km) south of Saint-Omer, at the junction of the D201 and D195 roads.

Population

Places of interest
 The church of Notre-Dame, dating from the sixteenth century.
 The Château de Laprée, built in 1760.

See also
Communes of the Pas-de-Calais department

References

External links

 Quiestède Table Tennis club website 

Communes of Pas-de-Calais